Nayaki is an Indian family drama which premiered on 17 June 2019 on Udaya TV and ended on 9 April 2020 starring Hema Chaudhary, Deepak Madhav and Kavyasri in lead roles with Lakshmi Siddaiah, Haripriya, Bhaskar, Mansi and Rachana Gowda in supporting roles. It is an official remake of Sun TV's Nayagi.

Plot
Unaware of the facts, Soundarya works as a maid in the house of a man who killed her father and usurped his property. Coincidentally, she falls in love with his son. When she learns the truth she seeks to exact revenge of his father and Baddi Bangaramna as Hema Choudhary playing main role in this series.

Cast
Hema Chaudhary as Bangaramma
Deepak Mahadev
Kavyasri
Lakshmi Siddaiah
Haripriya
Bhaskar
Mansi
Rachana Gowda
Tejaswini Anand Kumar

Adaptations

References

2019 Indian television series debuts
Kannada-language television shows
Udaya TV original programming
Kannada-language television series based on Tamil-language television series